Selenium chloride may refer to either of the following:

Selenium monochloride, Se2Cl2
Selenium dichloride, SeCl2
Selenium tetrachloride, SeCl4